The 1992 Ohio Valley Conference men's basketball tournament was the final event of the 1991–92 season in the Ohio Valley Conference. The tournament was held March 6–8, 1992, at Rupp Arena in Lexington, Kentucky.

Murray State defeated  in the championship game, 81–60, to win their third consecutive and sixth overall OVC men's basketball tournament.

The Racers received an automatic bid to the 1992 NCAA tournament as the #13 seed in the Midwest region.

Format
Seven of the eight conference members participated in the tournament field. They were seeded based on regular season conference records, with the top seed (Murray State) receiving a bye to the semifinal round. The teams were re-seeded after the opening round.  did not participate.

Bracket

References

Ohio Valley Conference men's basketball tournament
Tournament
Ohio Valley Conference men's basketball tournament
Ohio Valley Conference men's basketball tournament
Basketball competitions in Lexington, Kentucky
College basketball tournaments in Kentucky